Lichenopeltella is a genus of fungi in the class Dothideomycetes with 48 species. Its classification is incertae sedis with respect to familial and ordinal placement within the class.
It maybe in Trichothyriaceae.

Species
Lichenopeltella alpestris  (2007)
Lichenopeltella ammophilae  (2007)
Lichenopeltella arctomiae  (2009)
Lichenopeltella biatorae  (2009)
Lichenopeltella bunodophoronis  (1997)
Lichenopeltella cetrariae  (1919)
Lichenopeltella cetrariicola  (1989)
Lichenopeltella cladoniarum  (1995)
Lichenopeltella communis  (2010)
Lichenopeltella coppinsii  (1999)
Lichenopeltella cupularum  (2007)
Lichenopeltella epiphylla  (1988)
Lichenopeltella fimbriata  (2007)
Lichenopeltella heppiae  (2012)
Lichenopeltella heterodermiae  (1997)
Lichenopeltella heterodermiicola  (2002)
Lichenopeltella hydrophila  (2001)
Lichenopeltella hypogymniae  (1997)
Lichenopeltella hypotrachynae  (1997)
Lichenopeltella leprosulae  (2009)
Lichenopeltella leptogii  (1997)
Lichenopeltella lobariae  (1996)
Lichenopeltella maculans  (1919)
Lichenopeltella megalosporae  (1997)
Lichenopeltella microspora  (1997)
Lichenopeltella minuta  (1989)
Lichenopeltella nigroannulata  (2007)
Lichenopeltella norfolciana  (2007)
Lichenopeltella palustris  (2007)
Lichenopeltella pannariacearum  (1997)
Lichenopeltella peltigericola  (1993)
Lichenopeltella physciae  (1997)
Lichenopeltella pinophylla  (2007)
Lichenopeltella pseudocyphellariae  (1997)
Lichenopeltella quinquecladiopsis  (2001)
Lichenopeltella ramalinae  (1997)
Lichenopeltella rangiferinae  (2011)
Lichenopeltella salicis  (2007)
Lichenopeltella santessonii  (1993)
Lichenopeltella sclerenchymatica  (2008)
Lichenopeltella setifera  (1996)
Lichenopeltella soiliae  (2015)
Lichenopeltella stereocaulorum  (2010)
Lichenopeltella swaminathaniana  (1996)
Lichenopeltella thalamica  (2017)
Lichenopeltella thamnoliae  (1998)
Lichenopeltella thelidii  (1998)
Lichenopeltella uncialicola  (2010)

References

Microthyriales
Dothideomycetes genera
Lichenicolous fungi
Taxa described in 1919
Taxa named by Franz Xaver Rudolf von Höhnel